Edwards v Halliwell [1950] 2 All ER 1064 is a UK labour law and UK company law case about the internal organisation of a trade union, or a company, and litigation by members to make an executive follow the organisation's internal rules.

Facts
Some members of the National Union of Vehicle Builders sued the executive committee for increasing fees. Rule 19 of the union constitution required a ballot and a two-thirds approval level by members. Instead a delegate meeting had purported to allow the increase without a ballot.

Judgment
Jenkins LJ granted the members' application. He held that under the rule in Foss v Harbottle the union itself is prima facie the proper plaintiff and if a simple majority can make an action binding, then no case can be brought. But there are exceptions to the rule. First, if the action is ultra vires a member may sue. Second, if the wrongdoers are in control of the union's right to sue there is a "fraud on the minority", and an individual member may take up a case. Third, as pointed out by Romer J in Cotter v National Union of Seamen a company should not be able to bypass a special procedure or majority in its own articles. This was relevant here. And fourth, as here, if there is an invasion of a personal right. Here it was a personal right that the members paid a set amount in fees and retain membership as they stood before the purported alterations.

Jenkins LJ gave the following reasons.

See also
 UK company law

References

United Kingdom company case law
United Kingdom labour case law
Court of Appeal (England and Wales) cases
1950 in case law
1950 in British law
United Kingdom trade union case law
Automotive industry in the United Kingdom